Oulins is a commune in the Eure-et-Loir department in northern France.

Population

Oulins, France is home to scale model manufacturer Solido.

See also
Communes of the Eure-et-Loir department

External Sources
 World War I Belgian Refugees: Comite Franco-American pour la Protection des Enfants de la Frontiere -- Oulins

References

Communes of Eure-et-Loir